Neurotoca is a genus of moths in the family Geometridae described by Warren in 1897.

Species
Neurotoca endorhoda Hampson, 1910
Neurotoca notata Warren, 1897

References

Geometrinae